Géraud de Geouffre de La Pradelle de Leyrat (1935-October 16, 2022) was an international jurist and a professor of French law.

Biography

Family 
He is the son of lawyer Raymond de Geouffre de la Pradelle, the grandson of Albert de Geouffre de La Pradelle and the uncle of Anne-Véronique Herter. He has two children with Claire Bardon Florence (wife Cédric Thomas) and Laure (wife François de Montpellier de Vedrin).

Emeritus Professor of the University of Nanterre, he worked from 1982 to 1988 at the center for information on Palestinian and Lebanese prisoners.

In 2003, he co-authored the first Que sais-je?, on homosexual rights.
 
In 2004, he chaired the Citizens' Commission of Inquiry into the Involvement of France in Rwanda, a collective  denouncing France's actions surrounding the Rwanda genocide.  In 2014, he co-wrote an article sharply critical of judge Jean-Louis Bruguière's 2006 ruling.

He was an occasional contributor to Le Monde diplomatique and was a member of the sponsoring committee of the Russell Tribunal on Palestine.

Books 
 Droit international privé, avec Marie-Laure Niboyet, Librairie générale de droit et de jurisprudence, 
 L'Homme juridique, Presses universitaires de Grenoble/François Maspero, coll. "Critique du droit", 1979
 Caroline Mécary et Géraud de La Pradelle, Les droits des homosexuel(le)s, PUF, Que sais-je ?, 2003, 1998,

Publications

References

French writers
1935 births
2022 deaths
Academic staff of Paris Nanterre University